Kandinsky is a surname. Notable people with the surname include:

 Victor Kandinsky (1849–1889), Russian physician
 Wassily Kandinsky (1866–1944), Russian painter and art theorist

See also
 Bibliothèque Kandinsky 
 Kandinsky Prize